Hudson Fasching (born July 28, 1995) is an American professional ice hockey winger, who is currently playing with the  New York Islanders of the National Hockey League (NHL).

Playing career

Amateur
Fasching played high school hockey for Apple Valley High School in Apple Valley, Minnesota. He then played two seasons for the USA Hockey National Team Development Program in the United States Hockey League.

Collegiate
Fasching committed to the University of Minnesota in December 2011. He was named to the Big Ten Conference's All-Freshman team after the 2013–14 season.

As a member of the Golden Gophers, Fasching recorded 94 points (46 goals and 48 assists) in 115 career games. He helped the Gophers win three straight regular season championships. His junior year, his final year at the school, he was an alternate captain and finished tied for first on the team in goals.

Professional

Fasching was drafted by the Los Angeles Kings in the fourth round, 118th overall, of the 2013 NHL Entry Draft. On March 5, 2014, Fasching's rights were traded along with Nicolas Deslauriers and a draft pick to the Buffalo Sabres in exchange for Brayden McNabb, Jonathan Parker and two draft picks.

On March 21, 2016, Fasching was signed to an entry-level pro contract by the Sabres. He made his NHL debut with the team on March 26, scoring his first NHL goal at 8:37 of the first period in a game against the Winnipeg Jets. Fasching eventually fell out of favor with Sabres management when a new regime took over in 2017; his first goal would be his only goal in 22 appearances with the Sabres. By the end of the 2017-18 season, the Sabres' farm team, the Rochester Americans, designated him a healthy scratch.

On June 14, 2018, Fasching was traded after two full seasons with the Sabres to the Arizona Coyotes in exchange for Brandon Hickey and Mike Sislo.

On August 23, 2022, having left the Coyotes as a free agent, Fasching signed a one-year, two way contract with the New York Islanders.

International play
Fasching represented the United States in the 2012 World U-17 Hockey Challenge, winning a silver medal. He also was part of the silver medal-winning American team at the 2013 IIHF World U18 Championships.

He played for the United States men's national junior ice hockey team at the IIHF World U20 Championship in both 2014 and 2015.

Career statistics

Regular season and playoffs

International

References

External links

1995 births
Living people
American men's ice hockey right wingers
Apple Valley High School (Minnesota) alumni
Arizona Coyotes players
Bridgeport Islanders players
Buffalo Sabres players
Ice hockey players from Minnesota
Los Angeles Kings draft picks
Minnesota Golden Gophers men's ice hockey players
People from Burnsville, Minnesota
New York Islanders players
Rochester Americans players
Ice hockey players from Wisconsin
Sportspeople from Milwaukee
Tucson Roadrunners players